High Impact Wrestling Canada (HIW) was a professional wrestling promotion, based in Regina, Saskatchewan, Canada. Known for its hard hitting "Saskatchewan Style", the HIW roster consisted of nearly 40 regular performers. On January 1, 2019, the company celebrated its 21-year anniversary. This anniversary made High Impact Wrestling one of the oldest continuously active pro-wrestling companies to run in Canada. HIW partnered with Access 7, a TV station in Regina, SK, in January 2014 to begin producing a weekly TV show which aired every Tuesday night at 8pm. The Access television program had aired for five consecutive seasons. HIW closed on October 25, 2019, after 21 years of operation. It was announced on September 20, 2019, that the company would be absorbed by Winnipeg based Canadian Wrestling's Elite.

History

Early history
In 1998, following the demise of the Hardcore Wrestling circuit that ran from 1996 – 1998, wrestler Charley Pichette, opted to open up a pro-wrestling training school which would also run periodic live events. Pichette named the company "World High Impact Pro-Wrestling" or "WHIP Wrestling" for short. Training would take place in an old, run down building on Quebec Street in Regina, Sk. Original members of the promotion included Pichette (who was then known as Charley Hayes), Todd Myers, Scotty Simms, Crusher Carlson, and Rex Roberts, with all members taking part in the training of young hopefuls. The training school began to pick up steam and added a number of new trainees. After enough local performers had joined and been trained, Pichette rounded out the roster with out of Province talent and ran some of the first WHIP Wrestling events. The first handful of events turned out decent crowds and Pichette continued to expand the roster with new trainees and ran a few live events a year.

At the end of 2003, Pichette decided that the company had grown enough in terms of roster size and fan base that the time had come to begin running regular monthly events in Regina. Monthly events took place at the Saskatchewan Veterans Hall on 12th Avenue in Regina. Pichette would run a matinee afternoon card that was geared towards family and a younger audience, and an evening card which was intended to cater to an older and livelier audience. The low ceiling in the building often hindered performers from being able to utilize top rope maneuvers as part of their arsenal, but the shows were still high energy and the company began to fill the building  to capacity during its evening events. Two championship belts were wrestled for during this period, the Central Canadian Heavyweight Championship (which serves as the promotions top title), and the Great Plains Provincial Title.

High Impact Wrestling
In 2004, after several months at the Vets Hall, Pichette moved his monthly events to the Saskatchewan Cultural Exchange on 8th avenue. The new venue was smaller in capacity but a higher ceiling allowed for higher risk moves by the performers. It was at this time that Pichette decided to give the product a fresh look, and began running the company under the name "High Impact Wrestling Regina" or "HIW Regina". Pichette continued to run matinee and evening cards, although the matinee cards often drew few spectators and eventually Pichette decided to do away with the matinee. The "up close and personal" atmosphere at the Exchange became synonymous with the live HIW Regina events, and gave fans a very interactive experience. The Canadian Tag Team titles was added to the list of championships and were originally won by Thryllin’ Dylan and Screaming Eagle in a tag team tournament. Soon, the company was filling the building on a regular basis and the time was coming to find a larger home for the monthly shows.

Pichette settled on a new venue and in 2005 HIW Regina began running monthly events from the Regina German Society Harmonie Club on St. John Street. The new venue was much larger than the previous and looked empty for many events even though the crowd numbers were very similar to those when the company ran at the Exchange. By 2006, the shows were drawing more and more spectators. In March of that year, an event featuring the Honky Tonk Man drew nearly 400 fans, an indoor record for the company at the time. A short lived decision to expand into Saskatoon, Saskatchewan prompted Pichette to briefly run the company as both "HIW Regina" and "HIW Saskatoon" dependent on which city the events were held, but after a disappointing audience in Saskatoon, the idea was put on the shelf. The decision was made to rename the company "High Impact Wrestling Canada" or "HIW Canada" to give the promotion a more "National" feel. Merchandise was produced including T-shirts, tank tops, toques, and even select women's underwear which featured the HIW Canada logo.

The company continued to draw large crowds to the German Club through 2007 and 2008, but the relationship between the club and HIW Canada began to sour. In 2009, despite the fact that the company had sold out 9 straight events at the venue, club management decided to end its business relationship with Pichette and his promotion. During the final event at the German Club in June 2009, veteran performer Big Daddy Kash grabbed the microphone before his match and delivered an infamously scathing rant directed towards the club president who was standing at ringside. Following the end of the relationship with the German Club, Pichette took two months off from running shows to find the company a new venue.

In September 2009, High Impact Wrestling Canada made its debut at the Victoria Club on Victoria Avenue. The Victoria Club was a much smaller venue, and in order to house the larger audiences that filled the German Club, Pichette decided to run a Friday evening card as well as a Saturday evening card in succession. The two cards would feature different matches but would still allow fans who weren't able to see the first show an opportunity to catch an HIW card the same weekend. Fans filled the building for both cards in the first series of weekend events but in the following months this would change. The Friday night events continued to draw good size audiences but smaller crowds would come out for the Saturday night card. Eventually, the Saturday events were scrapped, and HIW Canada would run Friday nights exclusively.

Television Program 2010

In 2010, High Impact Wrestling and Access Communications began producing a weekly television program that would air weekly on the Access 7 channel. Live events were split into two halves and two episodes were taped at each monthly event at the Victoria Club in Regina, SK. The episodes would only be available to Regina Access 7 cable subscribers. The program was short lived and was removed from regular scheduling on Access 7 by 2011.

Sale of HIW Canada
Following the end of the television program, Pichette continued to run moderately successful shows from the Victoria Club through 2011, also touring the northern part of the Province a handful of times throughout the year. In 2012, Pichette expanded the company to tour to the cities of Saskatoon, and Yorkton once a month. He also began touring northern centers more extensively and ran in excess of 35 live events during the course of the year. In December 2012, after nearly 20 years of involvement in professional wrestling, Pichette decided to sell High Impact Wrestling Canada  and take a leave from the sport. The company was sold to Mike Roberts, who performs under the name "King Kash". Since taking over the company, Roberts has continued the company's expansion to include several new Saskatchewan centers. HIW Canada continued to run regular live events from the Victoria Club until June 2013, when the company moved to its current home venue in Regina, SK, the Hungarian Club.

High Impact Wrestling Wildside Brand / Wildside Division / HIW Wildside Wrestling
On June 14, 2013, HIW management announced that a second brand under the "High Impact Wrestling" banner called "HIW Wildside" was to be launched and would begin running live events in the fall of that year. The two brands would run their own event calendar but would co-host  the "Big Three" events (Spring MELTDOWN, Pile O' Bones Rumble, and King's Challenge). The Wildside roster would employ a separate roster from the HIW Canada roster and feature a younger mix of up and comers with a handful of veteran performers.

Wildside's first involvement in an HIW event was Pile O' Bones Rumble XVIII in which the new brand co-hosted the annual Rumble event with the HIW Canada brand. The event took place On July 19, 2013, at the Hungarian Club in Regina, SK.

In August 2013, HIW Wildside hosted a portion of the "Blood Wars" Tour, a four-day tour that featured Wildside performers, HIW Canada performers, and Gangrel. The Wildside brand hosted their lone date on the tour on August 24, 2013, at the Western Development Museum in Moose Jaw, SK.

The first HIW Wildside brand event was held at the Victoria Club in Regina, SK on Friday, September 27 and was entitled "The Future Begins". The event was well received and plans to continue hosting regular events were given the go-ahead.

The "Road To Gold" event on November 22, 2013, featured a 4-way match to crown the first ever Wildside Provincial Champion. Performers in the 4-way championship match included Ethan Hawks, Ace Riviera, Rockstar, and then Great Plains Provincial Champion Michael Allen Richard Clark. Ethan Hawks was eliminated first, then the Rockstar, leaving Ace Riviera and Michael Allen Richard Clark. Clark eventually defeated Riviera to become the first champion in Wildside history. The Great Plains Provincial title and the Wildside Provincial title were subsequently unified the following day on November 23, 2013.

The Wildside brand currently runs monthly events at the Western Development Museum in Moose Jaw, SK and periodically in Regina, SK. The Cultural Exchange became the new home venue for Wildside in the Queen City and regular events will be hosted there.

On Saturday, September 20, 2014, HIW Wildside celebrated its one-year anniversary at the "NIGHT OF THE WILD" event at the Western Development Museum in Moose Jaw, SK. The show featured the brand's first ever Ladder Match which pitted Wildside's originals Ethan Hawks and Ace Riviera against one another.

On Thursday, January 21, 2015, the High Impact Wrestling parent office announced that the HIW Canada brand had absorbed the HIW Wildside brand in a move intended to further strengthen the all around product. Coming off the heels of the most successful year in company history, the absorption concept was on the table as a method to add more strength to the legs of High Impact Wrestling's continued expansion throughout Central Canada. It was also announced that despite the fact that Wildside would no longer run as a separate brand, it would now operate as a division within High Impact Wrestling with the Wildside Provincial Championship and its lineage continuing to represent the division.

In December 2016, the HIW office announced that a Wildside brand would be relaunched in May 2017. The new brand would run as a stand-alone brand based in Saskatoon, Saskatchewan, while Regina and Southern Saskatchewan would feature its own brand, the more traditional HIW Canada brand. A talent draft was announced and would take place in early 2017, the draft would include talent both currently employed by High Impact Wrestling at the time and non-HIW contracted talent. The first overall pick by the newly formed Wildside Wrestling office would "God's Gift to Wrestling" Michael Richard Blais. In a situation that created some controversy, then-Wildside champion Mike McSugar and then-Central Canadian heavyweight champion Michael Allen Richard Clark would be granted split brand contracts because they technically were never drafted and were forced to represent the respective brands of the championships they held. The new brand would present its own events with "Battle Arts" being the centerpiece event of its yearly schedule. The two brands would be jointly featured on the Spring Meltdown and Pile O' Bones Rumble events. HIW Wildside Wrestling ran its first event on May 11, 2017, with an event called "The Arrival". The HIW Wildside brand runs events across the northern portion of Saskatchewan while the HIW Canada brand covers events across the southern portion.

Return To Television
On January 1, 2014, HIW Canada announced that it would be returning to television in 2014 with a weekly hour-long program on Access 7. The first episodes were taped on January 17, 2014, at an event entitled "Pride & Glory" and began airing on March 4, 2014. The show was well received and wrapped up taping of its first season on Friday, April 25, 2014. Taping for the second season began on January 30, 2015, and the first episode of the second episode aired on February 10. Tapings for the 5th season wrapped on August 31, 2018. The show aired weekly every Tuesday evening at 8:00 pm with replays on Sunday at 1pm on Access 7 across Saskatchewan, and was also accessible through its On-Demand section.

HIW Renegade Wrestling brand extension
On Sunday, February 16, 2016, it was announced that High Impact Wrestling and Saskatchewan-based Renegade Wrestling had come to terms on a partnership agreement that will see Renegade Wrestling operate as an extended brand of the High Impact Wrestling parent company. Under the agreement, Renegade Wrestling would be re-branded as "HIW Renegade Wrestling" and would now operate under the High impact Wrestling banner. As an extended brand, the company will continue to run as an independent entity but with the benefit of promotional support from the parent company, as well as continued talent-sharing and a number of other unnamed amenities.

Renegade Wrestling operated independently for a number of years, running periodic live events across Saskatchewan with a focus on aboriginal communities. Renegade Wrestling and High Impact Wrestling had a loose working arrangement for a number of years in which HIW talent would be loaned to Renegade Wrestling for events, but no official agreement had ever been pursued until recently.

The first Renegade Wrestling event under the HIW banner took place on Wednesday, February 24, 2016, at Ochapawace First Nation, Saskatchewan. The event was announced as a High Impact Wrestling event throughout the show but since the event took place before the official agreement had been announced, it was not promoted as an HIW sanctioned event.

This would mark High Impact Wrestling's second foray into brand extension, the first being with the "HIW Wildside" brand that ran from mid-2013 until December 2015 before being absorbed by the parent company and becoming a competitive division within High Impact Wrestling.

Internet TV

On March 24, 2018, the Wildside brand released the first episode of its show "Wildside TV" on the High Impact Wrestling YouTube channel. The show was well received and new episodes have continued to be released weekly every Saturday morning.

45 episodes of "Wildside TV" were released, with the last episode being aired on February 16, 2019.
 
The HIW Canada brand announced that it would be launching its own program on the YouTube channel. Tapings for "Friday Night Impact" were expected to begin at the January 18th, 2019 live event in Regina, Saskatchewan and air weekly every Friday evening. No episodes were ever recorded.

Closing and absorption by Canadian Wrestling's Elite (CWE)

After 21 years of operation The HIW Canada Brand closed after Monster Brawl VI on October 25, 2019. This event featured Mexican professional wrestler Super Crazy. HIW announced on September 20, 2019, that it would be absorbed by Winnipeg Based Canadian Wrestling's Elite.

The "Big Four"

High Impact Wrestling's "Big Four" refers to the four major annual events the company hosted each year and consists of "Spring MELTDOWN", "Battle Arts", "Pile O' Bones Rumble", and the "King's Challenge".

Spring MELTDOWN
Spring MELTDOWN (as it is stylized) was an annual pro-wrestling event that took place in April of every year. The event grew to become the largest and most publicized event of the "Big Four" annual HIW events. There have been eight "Spring MELTDOWN" events to date, the most recent held on Friday, April 27, 2018. The first Spring MELTDOWN event in 2011 and its successor in 2012 were originally intended as a supplementary lead-in to the long running annual Pile O' Bones Rumble event, but the 2013 edition firmly established MELTDOWN as HIW's annual flagship event.

The first edition of the event took place on Friday, April 29, 2011, at the Victoria Club in Regina, SK and featured a 3-Way dance for the Central Canadian Heavyweight Championship between Rex Roberts, Cannonball Kelly, and then-champion, King Kash. The event was well received and drew a sell out audience. The second edition of the event was held on Friday, April 20, 2012, and once again received positive reviews and drew a large audience.

In 2013, the Spring MELTDOWN event became the first event to take place at High Impact Wrestling's new home venue in Regina, SK, the Hungarian Club. All expectations were surpassed as the event drew a crowd of nearly 400 and broke a High Impact Wrestling indoor attendance record. In the main event, Robbie Gamble defeated Thryllin' Dylan and Rex Roberts to retain the Central Canadian Heavyweight Championship.

The 2014 edition, like its predecessors, drew a sellout crowd and featured a main event match between Bull Bodnar and Rex Roberts for the Central Canadian Heavyweight title. Bodnar won the match and his first heavyweight title. The 2014 edition of Meltdown is remembered most often for a brutal Street Fight between El Asesino and then-HIW Wildside Champion, Michael Allen Richard Clark, that featured weapons such thumb tacks, tables, and barbed wire bat. The match is widely considered one of the most violent in HIW history. Spring Meltdown 2014 would be the first edition ever taped for HIW's weekly television program and aired over the course of three episodes as the season finale.

Spring MELTDOWN 2015, which took place on Friday, April 24, 2015, broke an HIW indoor attendance record with 610 fans in attendance. The event saw several matches including a 7-Man scramble match in which Alexander Prime became the youngest champion in HIW history by earning the HIW Wildside title. The event was headlined by a steel cage match between Cannonball Kelly and HIW CEO King Kash.

The 2016 edition of Spring MELTDOWN took place at the Highland Curling Club in Regina, SK on Friday, April 29 and for the second year in a row hosted a record breaking crowd of 653, moving ahead of the old record set in 2015 by 610 fans (the record would only hold up for 28 days before being broken on May 27 at "Battle Arts III" in Saskatoon, SK). The event was headlined by former WWE and TNA Impact star, Montel Vontavious Porter.

The 2018 edition of Spring MELTDOWN took place on April 27 in Regina, SK.  It was headlined by Ryback.  A fourth championship was sanctioned by HIW.  Charles T. Champ declared himself the Internet Champion, but it was never officially recognized.  After various HIW stars started going after the title, it was declared by HIW management that it would become an officially sanctioned title.  The first official champion was determined in a ladder match as Charles T. Champ took on Davey O'Doyle.

Pile O' Bones Rumble
The Pile O' Bones Rumble was an annual pro-wrestling event featuring a "Rumble" style battle royal match in which competitors are eliminated when they are forced over the top rope and to the floor by other participants. Two competitors start in the ring while a timer counts down to a predetermined amount of time. Once the time runs out, another competitor joins the match. Once all other participants have been eliminated and only one remains, that lone participant is declared the winner. The Pile O' Bones Rumble is the only annual event that predates the company itself and celebrated its 19th anniversary in 2014. The original "Rumbles" varied in number of participants from year to year and rules and stipulations of the match itself have undergone several changes over the years. The event historically takes place in either July or August. Currently, the winner of the Rumble receives a title match against the Central Canadian Heavyweight Champion and the runner up receives a title match against the Wildside Provincial Championship.

The first Pile O' Bones Rumble took place in the summer of 1996 at Wascana Park in Regina, SK. The event would continue to be a part of the outdoor "Pile O' Bones" festivities that took place at Wascana park every year until organizers discontinued the festival after the 2003 edition.

In 2004, the first indoor Pile O' Bones Rumble was held at the Cultural Exchange in Regina.

Pile O' Bones Rumble XV in 2010, which took place at the Victoria Club in Regina, saw a rule change to the "Rumble" match in which participants entered the Rumble in teams of 3. Teams would enter every 3 minutes but participant would be eliminated individually as in past Rumble matches. This would mark the only year the Rumble would feature this variance in rules and the following year returned to the familiar format from past Rumbles.

On Tuesday, July 17, 2012, WWE Hall of Fame inductee, Tito Santana, performed on the Pile O' Bones Rumble XVII event as he was defeated by the Rex Roberts via DQ. Santana also wrestled on the other two stops of the Tour De Rumble defeating Jumpin' Joe on July 16 in Yorkton, SK and earning a victory over King Kash on July 18 in Saskatoon.

Rex Roberts, Charlie Hayes, and "Tailormade" Todd Meyers are the only multiple-time winners of the Pile O' Bones Rumble match, each with two Rumble victories. Roberts and Hayes earned their respective Rumble victories in consecutive years, Hayes winning the 1998 and 1999 editions, and Roberts winning the 2012 and 2013 editions.

Since 2013, the annual Rumble match had incorporated a 30-participant system.

On Friday, August 7, 2015, the Pile O' Bones Rumble celebrated its 20th anniversary in Regina, SK. It is currently the oldest annual pro-wrestling event in Canada.

Pile O'Bones Rumble XXIII took place on August 31, 2018.  It was headlined by Mick Foley.  On May 14, 2018; HIW announced that the winner of the Pile O'Bones Rumble would become the first ever HIW Canadian Grand Champion. Shaun Moore won the Rumble, and became the first holder of the championship.

Tour De Rumble

The "Tour De Rumble" was an annual tour based around the Pile O' Bones Rumble event. The first "Tour De Rumble" took place in 2012. The tour stopped in Yorkton, SK on Monday, July 16, Regina, SK on Tuesday, July 17th (Pile O' Bones Rumble), and Saskatoon on Wednesday, July 18 and featured Tito Santana.

The second "Tour De Rumble" took place the following year in 2013, and made stops in Weyburn, Saskatoon, Regina (Pile O' Bones Rumble) and Melville, Saskatchewan. Each event featured an over the top rope battle royal.

In 2014, the "Tour De Rumble" featured 13 live events in 15 days making it the largest tour in company history and covered a large portion of Central Canada. Tour stops included Wawota, SK (August 1), Melville, SK (August 2), North Battleford, SK (August 3), Prince Albert, SK (August 4th), La Ronge, SK (August 5), Regina, SK (August 7 - Pile O' Bones Rumble), Moose Jaw, SK (August 8), Gordon First Nation, SK (August 9), Dauphin, MB (August 11), Kamsack, SK (August 12), Saskatoon (August 13), Esterhazy (August 14), and Regina, SK (August 15th). The tour was broken into 2 separate wings and each wing hosted a different special attraction performer. The first wing featured former World Championship Wrestling and TNA Wrestling star, April Hunter and the second wing featured Matt Striker.

The 2015 edition of the tour covered less distance than the previous but was still the second longest in the tour's history hitting six locations across Saskatchewan over the course of a week. Locations included Regina, SK (August 7 - Pile O' Bones Rumble XX), Melville (August 8), Rosthern (August 12), Prince Albert (August 13), Saskatoon (August 14), and Moose Jaw (August 15).

King's Challenge
The King's Challenge was an annual pro-wrestling event that featured a one-night single elimination "Lethal Lottery" tag team tournament. 16 performers were randomly selected onto 8 teams of 2 and were paired off in quarter final tag round matches. The first round winners moved on to the four team semi-final tag round. The two winners moved on to the final tag round and compete to decide the tournament finalists. Once winners were decided, the two members of the winning team then must square off immediately in the Final Challenge to decide the King's Challenge winner.

The first King's Challenge was a single match on an event entitled "King's Koronation" which took place Friday, October 29, 2010, at the Victoria Club in Regina. King Kash had become Central Canadian Heavyweight champion after defeating Bucky McGraw at the "Back To Business" event on October 1 and subsequently sending McGraw on a year-long hiatus from the ring. A "coronation" was planned to crown the new "King". During the coronation, King Kash called out the undercard performers on the HIW roster and berated them. He then laid down a challenge to any former Central Canadian Heavyweight champions who thought they could beat him. The Chief (now known as "Big Sweet") answered the challenge but would eventually lose to the King.

The Second King's Challenge was an event unto itself and was held at the Victoria Club on November 18, 2011. Among the other matches on the card, the "King's Challenge" was once again issued by King Kash, who had held the belt for a full calendar year at that point. The challenge was answered by the returning Bucky McGraw, the man who Kash had beaten for the title a year earlier. Kash defeated McGraw to win his second straight King's Challenge.

In 2012, the King's Challenge event was moved to December and would now feature a one night, single elimination tournament to crown a new King's Challenge winner. The tournament was called the "Tournament of Champions" and would feature only former Central Canadian Heavyweight Champions and Great Plains Provincial Champions. The winner of the Challenge would receive a shot at the Central Canadian Heavyweight champion. After winning 3 straight matches in one evening, Thryllin' Dylan won his first King's Challenge, and became the first Challenge winner to earn a title shot.

The King's Challenge IV which took place on December 6, 2013, saw a variance in the tournament format and featured a one night 16 man tag team tournament. 8 teams would be randomly selected from the pool of 16 and would square off in tag team matches. After the initial 4 rounds, one team would remain. The two members of the winning team would then square off to decide the Challenge winner. Bull Bodnar became the winner of the fourth King's Challenge when he defeated tournament partner, Cam!!ikaze.

The Central Canadian Heavyweight Championship was awarded to the winner of the Lethal Lottery tournament at the fifth annual King's Challenge on December 5, 2014. The title had been vacated in controversial fashion in September 2014, and HIW management opted to crown a new champion at the Challenge. This marked the first time a title has been awarded for winning the tournament.

The King's Challenge VI, which took place on December 11, 2015, saw changes to the tournament format. For the first time ever (as per stipulation put in place by HIW CEO King Kash), Cannonball Kelly's Central Canadian Heavyweight Championship would be on the line throughout the entire tournament, meaning that if Kelly, or Kelly's team, lost at any point in the tournament, the championship would immediately be vacated and awarded to the eventual winner of the tournament. As in previous years, the first round utilized "Lethal Lottery" rules and featured 16 participants randomly paired up into 8 teams in a single elimination bracket-style tournament with winners from each of the four 1st round matches moving on. As opposed to teams remaining in their original pairings as in KC-IV and KC-V, "Lethal Lottery" rules would apply to the round and the remaining 8 participants would be randomly regrouped into 4 teams with the winners moving on to the "Final Challenge". The "Final Challenge" would be a Fatal Four-Way Elimination match in which all four remaining participants would square off with each other with all four being in the ring at the same time. An elimination would take place whenever there was a pinfall or submission. "Lion Warrior" Bobby Sharp would eventually win the "Final Challenge" to earn his first Central Canadian Heavyweight championship. The event broke a King's Challenge attendance record with over 300 fans.

Battle Arts
Battle Arts was an annual High Impact Wrestling event that took place in Saskatoon, SK in May every year.  It was the newest event to be added to the list of major yearly HIW events. It's also the only one of the "Big Four" annual events that took place outside of Regina, SK, HIW's home market. The event was generally co-promoted and hosted by both High Impact Wrestling and Honor Fight! Promotions, an MMA company based in Saskatoon, SK.

The first Battle Arts event took place on Friday, May 6, 2014, at the Sutherland Curling Club in Saskatoon, SK. The event featured 6 bouts including a Three-Way "Guaranteed Contract On-A-Pole" match between Jeff Tyler, Ace Riviera, and El Asesino, in which the winner would earn a guaranteed contract to wrestle the HIW Wildside champion which could be "cashed in" at any time decided upon by the contract holder. The event was headlined by a two-ring "Double Jeopardy" battle royal with the winner receiving the #30 entrant spot at the annual Pile O' Bones Rumble event. The first Battle Arts event was well received and a second edition was planned for the following year.

On Friday, May 21, 2015, the second Battle Arts event took place at the same venue as the previous year, the Sutherland Curling Club in Saskatoon, SK. A similarly large crowd to the previous year's event took in the show. The event featured multiple title matches and once again included a "Guaranteed Contract On-A-Pole" match with the same stipulation but with four competitors instead of three like the previous year. The #30 entrant spot for the 2015 Pile O' Bones Rumble was once again up for grabs in a battle royal main event which the "Zombie Hunter" Mentallo won.

The third installment of the Battle Arts event took place on Friday, May 27 at the Sutherland Curling Club in Saskatoon, SK. The event shattered the HIW indoor attendance record with 1,239 in attendance, breaking a record that was set only 28 days earlier at Spring Meltdown 2016 in Regina, SK.

Battle Arts V took place on May Long Weekend at the Sutherland Curling Club in Saskatoon once again, and featured a main event match between Michael Allen Richard Clark and the "American Nightmare" Cody Rhodes.  Battle Arts VI took place on August 17, 2019.  It featured Jay Lethal challenging Bobby Sharp for the HIW Wildside Provincial Championship.

Former personnel
Former personnel consisted of wrestlers, managers/valets, ring announcers, and broadcast team.

Wrestlers

Tag Teams and stables

Managers/valets

Commentators, interviewers, and ring announcer

Championships and accomplishments

HIW Hall of Fame

 – Entries without a birth name indicates that the inductee did not perform under a ring name.
 – This section mainly lists the major accomplishments of each inductee in the promotion.

Footnotes

References

External links
HIW Canada Official Site

 - HIW Wildside

Canadian professional wrestling promotions
Professional wrestling in Saskatchewan